The Whistle is a 1921 American silent drama film directed by Lambert Hillyer and written by May Wilmoth, Olin Lyman and Lambert Hillyer. The film stars William S. Hart, Frank Brownlee, Myrtle Stedman, Georgie Stone, Will Jim Hatton, and Richard Headrick. The film was released in April 1921, by Paramount Pictures. A print of the film is in the Library of Congress.

Plot
Robert Evans (William S. Hart) loses his son, Danny (Will Jim Hatton), due to dangerous working conditions. His employer, Henry Chapple (Frank Brownlee), refuses to fix the problem. Evans takes revenge by kidnapping Chapple's son, Georgie (Georgie Stone), and raising him as he did his own. It's a life of labor, the opposite of the life which the Chapples would have given Georgie. Years later, Chapple meets Evans again while he is injured. He provides the best medical care he can for him, regardless of the cost. As Georgie spends more time with the Chapples, Mrs. Chapple (Myrtle Stedman) grows very fond of him. The Chapples ask if they can adopt him. Evans is divided between his revenge against Mr. Chapple and the love which Mrs. Chapple has for her son. At the end, Evans realizes that by taking fate into his own hands, he has made himself more unhappy than anyone.

Cast
William S. Hart as Robert Evans
Frank Brownlee as Henry Chapple
Myrtle Stedman as Mrs. Chapple
Georgie Stone as Georgie
Will Jim Hatton as Danny Evans
Richard Headrick as Baby Chapple

Preservation status
Prints held at the Library of Congress, BFI National Film and Television Archive, Academy Film Archive(Beverly Hills), George Eastman House Motion Picture Collection.

References

External links 

 
 

1921 films
1920s English-language films
Silent American drama films
1921 drama films
Paramount Pictures films
Films directed by Lambert Hillyer
American black-and-white films
Articles containing video clips
American silent feature films
1920s American films